The Upper Sûre Natural Park is a national park in north-western Luxembourg.  Located in the Oesling region, the park is primarily an area of conservation and a specially protected area for wild birds.

At the heart of the park is the Upper Sûre Lake, the largest area of water in Luxembourg.

Objectives
The objectives of the park are threefold:
To protect the natural environment and ecosystem. The main principle underlying ecosystem protection in the park is that the environment is an integral network in which each element interacts and affects the functioning of the while. This means preserving the indigenous flora and fauna as well as protecting the purity of air, water, and soil quality.
To develop economic activity, mostly forestry and low-density tourism as a means of creating employment and a high quality life. As a result, the transportation infrastructure throughout the park is excellent. To achieve this, the park provides a host of leisure activities, from nature walks to tours of cultural monuments, to water sports on the Upper Sûre Lake. A fair and festival is held in the park annually on the first weekend in July.
To preserve the architectural heritage of the area, which ranges from large numbers of chapels and disused mills to former slate quarries and castle ruins.

References

External links

  Official website of the Upper Sûre Natural Park
Awarded "EDEN - European Destinations of Excellence" non traditional tourist destination 2010

Geography of Luxembourg
Forests of Luxembourg
Environment of Luxembourg
Wiltz (canton)
Lac de la Haute-Sûre
Ramsar sites in Luxembourg
Nature parks in Luxembourg